Hulftsdorp (also written, incorrectly as Hultsdorf ) is a suburb in Colombo, Sri Lanka. It is part of the postal area known as Colombo 12. It has been known historically as Hulffsdorp, Hulfsdorp, Hulftsdorp, Hulsdorp, Hulstsdorp and Hülffsdorf.

History
The name of the suburb Hulftsdorp is a commemoration of General Gerard Pieterszoon Hulft, the Dutch East India Company's Director of India and commander in chief of the company's forces in Ceylon (Sri Lanka) and on the Coast of India. Its name in Dutch translates to "Hulft's Town". He was killed while besieging Colombo. The hill on which he had his headquarters was named 'Hulft's Dorp' during the Dutch occupation. Nowadays, Hulftsdorp is regarded as the centre of legal activity in Colombo being the location of the Hulftsdorp court complex and the Sri Lanka Law Courts.

References

Populated places in Western Province, Sri Lanka